Yde Girl is a bog body found in the Stijfveen peat bog near the village of Yde, Netherlands. She was found on 12 May 1897 and was reputedly uncannily well-preserved when discovered (especially her hair), but by the time the body was turned over to the authorities two weeks later, it had been severely damaged and deteriorated. Most of her teeth and hair had been pulled from the skull. The peat cutting tools had also been reported to have severely damaged the body.

Examination

Carbon-14 tests have indicated that Yde Girl died between 54 BC and 128 AD at an approximate age of 16 years. She had long reddish-blond hair, but one side of her head was initially thought to have been shaved before she died. Recent studies of Windeby I, however, have suggested that the shaved hair phenomenon in some bog bodies may simply attest to one side of the head being exposed to oxygen slightly longer than the other. Scans have shown that she suffered from scoliosis.

The body was found clad in a woolen cape and with a woolen band, made in a braiding technique known as sprang, wrapped around the neck, suggesting she was executed or sacrificed. There was also a stab wound in the area of her collarbone, but this was determined to not be the cause of death. It is thought that she may have died while unconscious, as defensive wounds were absent on the hand that was recovered from the body, unlike a similar case in Germany, the Kayhausen Boy, who had a cut on his left hand from an apparent defense attempt. As with most bog bodies, the skin and features are still preserved because of the tannic acid in the marsh water. When Yde Girl was excavated, the diggers accidentally caused a wound to the skull. Only the torso of the girl, the head, the right hand and the feet remain intact today. The rest of her body was not preserved or had been damaged by peat cutting tools.

Exhibit

The Yde Girl was put on display and further study was not carried out on the remains until 1992. Richard Neave, of University of Manchester, took a CT scan of the skull of Yde Girl and determined her age, both anatomically and historically. The Yde Girl became internationally known when Neave made a reconstruction of her head, using techniques from plastic surgery and criminal pathology. Due to the state of the body, the work on the reconstruction included some guesswork, for example, the nose and some other facial features. Yde Girl and her modern reconstruction are displayed at the Drents Museum in Assen.

Yde Girl, along with Roter Franz and the Weerdinge Men, were transported across the world for a museum tour in both the early and mid 2000s. The exhibition provoked protest in Canada, where ethics standards prohibit the showing of bodies of indigenous people, and experts and public alike often consider display of the dead to be distasteful.

References

External links

Yde Girl – as discovered and facial reconstruction at James M. Deem's Mummy Tombs site.
National Geographic September 2007: "Tales From the Bog"

1897 archaeological discoveries
Archaeological discoveries in the Netherlands
Bog bodies
Deaths by strangulation
Disability studies
Drents Museum
Tynaarlo
1st-century BC European people
1st-century European people
2nd-century European people
1st-century BC women
1st-century women
2nd-century women